is a Japanese television drama series and the 106th Asadora series, following Come Come Everybody. It premiered on April 11, 2022, and concluded on September 30, 2022.

Plot

Cast

Higa's family 

 Yuina Kuroshima as Nobuko Higa
 Kurumi Inagaki as young Nobuko
 Yukie Nakama as Yūko Higa, Nobuko's mother
 Nao Omori as Kenzō Higa, Nobuko's father
 Ryo Ryusei as Kenshū Higa, Nobuko's brother
 Daiji Asakawa as young Kenshū
 Haruna Kawaguchi as Ryōko Higa, Nobuko's eldest sister
 Kino Tsuchiya as young Ryōko
 Moka Kamishirashi as Utako Higa, Nobuko's younger sister
 Aio Fuse as young Utako

Okinawa people 

 Hio Miyazawa as Kazuhiko Aoyagi, Nobuko's childhood friend and newspaper reporter
 Kanau Tanaka as young Kazuhiko
 Yuki Yamada as Hiroo Ishikawa, Ryōko's friend
 Gōki Maeda as Satoru Sunagawa, tofu shop owner's son
 Kazuhiro Yamaji as Zenichi Maeda, village only shop's owner
 Kaho Takada as Sanae Maeda, Zenichi's daughter
 Hairi Katagiri as Kyōko Shimoji, Nobuko's high school music teacher
 Kenjiro Ishimaru as Kenichi Higa, Nobuko's relative
 Daichi Watanabe as Kingo Kina
 Hitomi-kyan as Aunt Aragaki
 Michiko Ameku as Aunt Amuro
 Shigeyuki Totsugi as Fumihiko Aoyagi, Kazuhiko's father

Tokyo people 

 Kai Inowaki as Nobuko's senior working at Italian restaurant
 Marie Iitoyo as Ai Ōno, Kazuhiko's colleague and lover
 Aimi Satsukawa as Kiyoe Ino
 Takashi Yamanaka as Jinnai Tarashima, Kazuhiko's boss
 Takeo Nakahara as Tomohiro Ino, Kiyoe's father
 Mieko Harada as Fusako Ōshiro, Italian restaurant owner
 Masanobu Takashima as Kōji Futatsubashi, Italian restaurant head chef and Nobuko's boss

Tsurumi people 
 Tsurutaro Kataoka as Saburō Taira, president of Okinawa Kenjinkai
 Satomi Nagano as Tae Taira, Saburō's wife
 Hayato Fujiki as Junji Kaneshiro, boarding house landlord

References

External links 
 Official website (in Japanese)

2022 Japanese television series debuts
2022 Japanese television series endings
Asadora